The ALCO RSC-3 was a diesel-electric locomotive of the road switcher type rated at , that rode on three-axle trucks, having an A1A-A1A wheel arrangement.

Used in much the same manner as its four-axle counterpart, the ALCO RS-3, though the axle load was spread out for operation on light rail such as are found on branch lines. This locomotive had much better success as an export unit than in the domestic market.

Original owners

Locomotives built by Alco

Locomotives built by Montreal Locomotive Works

Preserved
This list is incomplete. Please help expand it.

Australia
 4001  Preserved at the NSWRTM Thirlmere
 4002  Preserved at the PRHS Western Australia
 4006  On static display Wickham WA

Brazil
 7653 operating in Supervia

Canada
 PGE 561 operating in Squamish at the West Coast Railway Heritage Park

Portugal
 1525 operating in SOMAFEL

See also 
 http://www.northeast.railfan.net/diesel64.html ALCo RSC-3
 List of ALCO diesel locomotives
 List of MLW diesel locomotives

References

External links
 http://www.rrpicturearchives.net/modelthumbs.aspx?mid=977 Pictures of RSC3's

A1A-A1A locomotives
RS-03C
RS-03C
Railway locomotives introduced in 1950
Diesel-electric locomotives of the United States
Standard gauge locomotives of the United States
5 ft 6 in gauge locomotives
Diesel-electric locomotives of Australia
Diesel-electric locomotives of Brazil
Standard gauge locomotives of Canada
Standard gauge locomotives of Australia
5 ft 3 in gauge locomotives
5 ft gauge locomotives
Diesel-electric locomotives of Canada